The arrondissement of Nice is an arrondissement of France in the Alpes-Maritimes department in the Provence-Alpes-Côte d'Azur region. It has 101 communes.

Composition

The communes of the arrondissement of Nice, and their INSEE codes, are:

 Ascros (06005)
 Aspremont (06006)
 Auvare (06008)
 Bairols (06009)
 Beaulieu-sur-Mer (06011)
 Beausoleil (06012)
 Belvédère (06013)
 Bendejun (06014)
 Berre-les-Alpes (06015)
 Beuil (06016)
 Blausasc (06019)
 La Bollène-Vésubie (06020)
 Bonson (06021)
 Breil-sur-Roya (06023)
 La Brigue (06162)
 Cantaron (06031)
 Cap-d'Ail (06032)
 Castagniers (06034)
 Castellar (06035)
 Castillon (06036)
 Châteauneuf-d'Entraunes (06040)
 Châteauneuf-Villevieille (06039)
 Clans (06042)
 Coaraze (06043)
 Colomars (06046)
 Contes (06048)
 La Croix-sur-Roudoule (06051)
 Cuébris (06052)
 Daluis (06053)
 Drap (06054)
 Duranus (06055)
 Entraunes (06056)
 L'Escarène (06057)
 Èze (06059)
 Falicon (06060)
 Fontan (06062)
 Gilette (06066)
 Gorbio (06067)
 Guillaumes (06071)
 Ilonse (06072)
 Isola (06073)
 Lantosque (06074)
 Levens (06075)
 Lieuche (06076)
 Lucéram (06077)
 Malaussène (06078)
 Marie (06080)
 Massoins (06082)
 Menton (06083)
 Moulinet (06086)
 Nice (06088)
 Peille (06091)
 Peillon (06092)
 La Penne (06093)
 Péone (06094)
 Pierlas (06096)
 Pierrefeu (06097)
 Puget-Rostang (06098)
 Puget-Théniers (06099)
 Revest-les-Roches (06100)
 Rigaud (06101)
 Rimplas (06102)
 Roquebillière (06103)
 Roquebrune-Cap-Martin (06104)
 Roquestéron (06106)
 La Roquette-sur-Var (06109)
 Roubion (06110)
 Roure (06111)
 Saint-André-de-la-Roche (06114)
 Saint-Antonin (06115)
 Saint-Blaise (06117)
 Saint-Dalmas-le-Selvage (06119)
 Sainte-Agnès (06113)
 Saint-Étienne-de-Tinée (06120)
 Saint-Jean-Cap-Ferrat (06121)
 Saint-Léger (06124)
 Saint-Martin-d'Entraunes (06125)
 Saint-Martin-du-Var (06126)
 Saint-Martin-Vésubie (06127)
 Saint-Sauveur-sur-Tinée (06129)
 Saorge (06132)
 Sauze (06133)
 Sigale (06135)
 Sospel (06136)
 Tende (06163)
 Thiéry (06139)
 Toudon (06141)
 Touët-de-l'Escarène (06142)
 Touët-sur-Var (06143)
 La Tour (06144)
 Tourette-du-Château (06145)
 Tournefort (06146)
 Tourrette-Levens (06147)
 La Trinité (06149)
 La Turbie (06150)
 Utelle (06151)
 Valdeblore (06153)
 Venanson (06156)
 Villars-sur-Var (06158)
 Villefranche-sur-Mer (06159)
 Villeneuve-d'Entraunes (06160)

History

The arrondissement of Nice is roughly equivalent to the ancient County of Nice, a historical region belonging first to the Duchy of Savoy and then to the Kingdom of Piedmont-Sardinia. Conquered in 1792 by the armies of the First French Republic, the County of Nice continued to be part of France until 1814; but after that date it reverted to the Kingdom of Piedmont-Sardinia. After the Treaty of Turin was signed in 1860 between the Sardinian king and Napoleon III as a consequence of the Plombières Agreement, the County of Nice was again and definitively ceded to France as a territorial reward for French assistance in the Second Italian War of Independence against Austria, which saw Lombardy united with Piedmont-Sardinia.

In particular, the arrondissement of Nice was created in 1800 during the first French annexation, disbanded in 1814 after the Treaty of Paris, when its territory returned to the Kingdom of Piedmonte-Sardinia, and restored in 1860 after the aforementioned Treaty of Turin. As a result of the reorganisation of the cantons of France which came into effect in 2015, the borders of the cantons are no longer related to the borders of the arrondissements. The cantons of the arrondissement of Nice were, as of January 2015:

 Beausoleil
 Breil-sur-Roya
 Contes
 L'Escarène
 Guillaumes
 Lantosque
 Levens
 Menton-Est
 Menton-Ouest
 Nice 1st Canton
 Nice 2nd Canton
 Nice 3rd Canton
 Nice 4th Canton
 Nice 5th Canton
 Nice 6th Canton
 Nice 7th Canton
 Nice 8th Canton
 Nice 9th Canton
 Nice 10th Canton
 Nice 11th Canton
 Nice 12th Canton
 Nice 13th Canton
 Nice 14th Canton
 Puget-Théniers
 Roquebillière
 Roquestéron
 Saint-Étienne-de-Tinée
 Saint-Martin-Vésubie
 Saint-Sauveur-sur-Tinée
 Sospel
 Tende
 Villars-sur-Var
 Villefranche-sur-Mer

References

Nice